A condominium is a type of living space similar to an apartment.

Condominium may also refer to:

 Condominium (international law), a political territory
 Condominium (film), a 1980 American TV film
Condominium, a novel by John D. MacDonald, on which the film was based
 Condominio ('Condominium'), a 1991 Italian comedy drama film 
 El Condominio ('the Condominium'), a Puerto Rican TV show 2000–2005

See also

Condo (disambiguation)